Ariel Behar and Gonzalo Escobar were the defending champions but only Escobar chose to defend his title, partnering Artem Sitak. Escobar lost in the semifinals to Íñigo Cervantes and Oriol Roca Batalla.

Cervantes and Roca Batalla won the title after defeating Collin Altamirano and Vitaliy Sachko 6–3, 6–4 in the final.

Seeds

Draw

References

External links
 Main draw

Lima Challenger - Doubles
2020 Doubles